Rocca Cigliè is a comune (municipality) in the Province of Cuneo in the Italian region Piedmont, located about  southeast of Turin and about  east of Cuneo.

Rocca Cigliè borders the following municipalities: Castellino Tanaro, Cigliè, Clavesana, Marsaglia, and Niella Tanaro.

Demographic evolution

References

Cities and towns in Piedmont
Comunità Montana Valli Mongia, Cevetta e Langa Cebana